Sesar is a village in Azad Kashmir.

Sesar may also refer to:

 Josip Sesar, Croatian professional basketball player
 Single European Sky ATM Research, a European air traffic control research program
 System for Earth Sample Registration, see International Geo Sample Number

See also
 Sesara
 Cesar (disambiguation)